Junín District is one of four districts of the Junín Province in Peru.

Geography 
Other mountains are listed below:

See also
 Allqaqucha
 Antaqucha
 Chiqllaqucha
 Lake Junin
 Waqraqucha

References